Vojens  is a railway town in Denmark with a population of 7,475 (1 January 2022). It was the main town of the now abolished Vojens Municipality, now the second largest town of Haderslev Municipality in Region of Southern Denmark. The town is served by Vojens Airport.

Church 

Vojens Church is a reunion-church, from the beginning of the 1920s and was inaugurated on 6 September 1925. The church yard is older than the church and it was taken in use on 28 January 1878. In the middle of the churchyard, lies "the red chapel", which was built a few years after the churchyard was established and the chapel was taken in use in 1883.

Speedway 

Vojens has a rich history in motorcycle speedway and hosted the World Final on two occasions (1988 and 1994) at the Vojens Speedway Center. The Speedway Center is part-owned by Denmark's first triple World Champion Ole Olsen, and has also hosted the Speedway Grand Prix of Denmark as part of the Speedway Grand Prix from 1995-2002 after which the SGP series moved the Danish GP to the Parken Stadium in Copenhagen.

The Vojens Speedway Center also hosted the Speedway World Team Cup final in 1983, 1986 (as Round 2 of a 3 Round Final), 1991 and 1998. The World Team Cup was replaced with the Speedway World Cup following 2000 and the Speedway Center hosted the 2003, 2008, 2010 and 2015 finals. Also held were the 1979 Speedway World Pairs Championship and the 1977 Under-21 European Championship. The Under-21 championship became the World Under-21 Championship in 1988 and Vojens hosted the 1999 Under-21 World Final.

Notable people 
 Hans Christian Schmidt (born 1953) a Danish politician and former Minister of Transport. A teacher by profession, he was the Danish Minister of Food from 2004 to 2007. Before that, he was the Minister for the Environment from 2001. He is a member of Venstre (the Danish Liberal Party). He is a longtime resident of the town of Vojens. 
 George Galbraith (born 1955) a Canadian-born Danish former professional ice hockey goaltender. He played for Vojens IK and in the World Championships with the Denmark men's national ice hockey team in 1986 and 1994
 Kurt Thiim (born 1956 in Vojens) a Danish race car driver, he raced in single-seaters from 1978 to 1984 
 Kim Lykkeskov (born 1983 in Vojens) a Danish professional ice hockey player who participated at the 2010 IIHF World Championship

References

Cities and towns in the Region of Southern Denmark
Haderslev Municipality